Alexander Alexandrovich Polovtsov (1832–1909) was a Russian Imperial statesman, historian and maecenas; he was also known as the founder of the Russian Imperial Historian Society (it was founded in 1866 and dissolved in 1917).

Biography
Alexander was born to a medium noble family. His father had his family estate in the Luga uyezd of the Governorate of St. Petersburg and served as a government bureaucrat working for the Governing Senate and later for the Ministry for the State Property.  Alexander's mother came from a noble family of Tatischevs; historian Sergey Tatischev was Polovtsov's cousin.

Polovtsov graduated from the Imperial School of Jurisprudence and started his work in the 1st department of the Governing Senate. In 1861, Polovtsov married Nadezhda Mikhaylovna Yunina (1843–1908), the only foster daughter of the first Chairman of the State Bank of the Russian Empire, Alexander von Stieglitz. According to popular belief, Nadezhda was an illegitimate daughter of Grand Duke Mikhail Pavlovich of Russia and an unknown lady-in-waiting. The marriage brought Polovtsov not only one million rubles of dowry and eventually 16-17 millions of rubles as Stieglitz's inheritance but also the help of the Emperor Nicholas I of Russia, who was helping his alleged niece. The couple had seventeen children together, but only four of them survived until adult age. 

In 1871, Polovtsov became a senator, and from 1873 he was the Secretary of State and simultaneously the State-Secretary of the Emperor Alexander III of Russia. Since 1892 until his death in 1909, he was a member of the State Council.

Polovtsov was the initiator of the creation of the Russian Historical Society (created in 1865). He was the Secretary of the society from 1866-1879 and the Chairman of the society from 1879 until his death in 1909. The society commissioned works of such historians as Sergey Solovyov, Nikolay Kostomarov, Vasily Klyuchevsky who set the foundation for the History of Russia. Under Polovtsov, the society published 128 volumes of Sborniks of Russian Historical Society. Polovtsov also prepared the 25 volumes of the Russian Biographical Dictionary that played an important role as the source of the biographical data on Russian people. To correctly establish the notability, Polovtsov refused to include biographies of living people. Polovtsov (together with his father-in-law Alexander von Stieglitz) founded the Stieglitz Museum of Applied Arts.

Children
 Anna (1861–1917), wife of Prince Alexander Dmitrievich Obolensky (1847–1917), grandmother of Sir Dimitri Obolensky;
 Twin daughters (1862), stillborn or died shortly after birth;
 Yekaterina (1863) was a frail child and failed to survive for more than a month;
 Nadezhda (1864-1869) died at the age of four;
 Maria (1865-1867) died at the age of two;
 Daughter (1866), stillborn or died shortly after birth; 
 Alexander Alexandrovich Polovtsov, junior (1867—1944) — Diplomat;
 Daughter (1869), stillborn or died shortly after birth; 
 Ivan (1870-1872), died at the age of two;
 Daughter (1872), stillborn or died shortly after birth; 
 Olga (1873-1873); 
 Peter Alexandrovich Polovtsov, (1874—1964) — general
 Unnamed child (1875), stillborn or died shortly after birth;
 Unnamed child (1881), stillborn or died shortly after birth;
 Unnamed child (1883), stillborn or died shortly after birth;
 Unnamed child (1884), stillborn or died shortly after birth;

References

19th-century historians from the Russian Empire
Russian nobility
Imperial School of Jurisprudence alumni
Members of the State Council (Russian Empire)
Honorary members of the Saint Petersburg Academy of Sciences
1832 births
1909 deaths
19th-century male writers from the Russian Empire